The Qased (also Ghased) rocket is an Iranian expendable small-lift orbital space launch vehicle. It made its maiden flight in 2020, lofting Iran's first military satellite named Noor into orbit.

Design 
The  diameter second stage is the solid fueled Salman with a lightweight carbon fiber composite casing, a flexible nozzle with thrust vectoring capability, and a burn time of 60 seconds. The third stage was erroneously believed to be a Saman-1 upper stage with an Arash-24 solid fuel motor with a burn time of 40 seconds. Later publicly revealed images revealed it was a specific system developed by the IRGC.

Strategic implications 
The launcher is notable as it is operated by the Islamic Revolutionary Guard Corps Aerospace force rather than the Iranian Space Agency and is small enough to be launched from a transporter erector launcher. The launch unveiled a full-blown parallel military space program separate from the ISA, with separate development paths and solid fueled launch vehicles, as opposed to the ISA's liquid fueled rockets.

In terms of the Noor satellite itself, the launch does not fundamentally change the security equations in the Middle East, however the unveiling of the IRGC space program and its emphasis towards solid fueled launch vehicles (which are more military viable than Iran's previous liquid fueled launchers like the Simorgh) might indicate Iran's hedging strategy to acquire ICBM technology without the security repercussions of openly attempting to do so.

Launch history

Gallery

See also 
IRGC Aerospace Force
Salman (rocket stage)
Noor (satellite)
Shahroud Space Center
Other Iranian satellite launch vehicles

 Safir (rocket)

Simorgh (rocket)
Zuljanah (rocket)
Qaem-100 (rocket)

External links
 
 First launch video -

References 

Space launch vehicles of Iran
Microsatellite launch vehicles